Andronymus marina is a butterfly in the family Hesperiidae. It is found in Uganda (the northern and western shores of Lake Victoria) and north-eastern Zambia.

The larvae are known to feed on Baikiaea eminii.

References

Butterflies described in 1937
Erionotini